Mentzelia decapetala (commonly known as tenpetal blazingstar, evening-star, candleflower, gumbo lily, or chalk lily) is a herbaceous biennial or short-lived perennial with large white flowers that bloom at night. It is native to dry areas in the western United States.

References

External links
 
 Ten-petal mentzelia in Kansas Wildflowers and Grasses, K-State Libraries

decapetala
Flora of the Great Plains (North America)
Flora of the Western United States
Flora without expected TNC conservation status